The 1916 Hertford by-election was held on 9 March 1916.  The by-election was held due to the resignation of the incumbent Conservative MP, Sir John Rolleston.  It was won by the Independent candidate Noel Pemberton Billing.

References

1916 elections in the United Kingdom
1916 in England
20th century in Hertfordshire
By-elections to the Parliament of the United Kingdom in Hertfordshire constituencies
History of Hertford
March 1916 events